Thumatha kakamegae is a moth in the family Erebidae. It was described by Lars Kühne in 2007. It is found in Kenya and Uganda.

References

Moths described in 2007
Nudariina